CD6 (Cluster of Differentiation 6) is a human protein encoded by the  gene.

Function 

This gene encodes a protein found on the outer membrane of T-lymphocytes as well as some other immune cells. The encoded protein contains three scavenger receptor cysteine-rich (SRCR) domains and a binding site for an activated leukocyte cell adhesion molecule. The gene product is important for continuation of T cell activation.

Clinical significance 

Certain alleles of this gene may be associated with susceptibility to multiple sclerosis.

See also
 Cluster of differentiation

References

Further reading

External links
 
 

Clusters of differentiation